College Building may refer to:

 Peter MacKinnon Building, of the University of Saskatchewan, in Saskatoon, Saskatchewan, Canada
 Wren Building, of the College of William and Mary, in Williamsburg, Virginia, United States